The M. Baylis House is a historic house located at 530 Sweet Hollow Road in Melville, Suffolk County, New York.

Description and history 
It was built in approximately 1820 and is a -story, five-bay wide dwelling with a saltbox profile.

It was added to the National Register of Historic Places on September 26, 1985.

References

Houses on the National Register of Historic Places in New York (state)
Houses completed in 1820
Houses in Suffolk County, New York
National Register of Historic Places in Huntington (town), New York